Manchón is a surname. Notable people with the surname include:

Beatriz Manchón (born 1976), Spanish sprint canoeist
Blanca Manchón (born 1987), Spanish windsurfer
Eduardo Manchón (1930–2010), Spanish footballer

See also
Manchón-Guamuchal, a nature reserve in Guatemala